"He Touched Me" is a gospel song written by Bill Gaither in 1963.

History
While Bill Gaither was accompanying Dr. Dale Oldham on his evangelistic crusades, the preacher said to him, "Bill, the word 'touch' is a very popular word. It comes up so often in the New Testament stories about Jesus touching people's eyes and healing them, or touching people's lives and changing them. It's a special, spiritual word and you ought to write a song that praises His touch." So Gaither did. That week, Dr. Oldham's son Doug Oldham began singing it in the meetings. Doug was also the first to record the song (in 1964). Not long after that, the Bill Gaither Trio recorded it.

In 1965, The Imperials first recorded "He Touched Me" for their album The Happy Sounds of Jake Hess and the Imperials, then recorded a newer version in 1969 for the album Love Is The Thing. It was this version that Elvis Presley heard, and made him want to record it himself. On May 5, 1971, Elvis recorded it—along with the Imperials (as backup singers)—and was released as a single. It became the title track of his 1972 Grammy Award-winning album He Touched Me. In 1972, due to Elvis' version of the song being popular, Terry Meeuwsen performed a cover version of the song as her talent for Miss America 1973. She won the title.

Other notable recorded versions
 1967: The Blackwood Brothers on the album With a Song on My Lips and a Prayer in My Heart
 1967: Jimmy Durante on Songs for Sunday
 1968: Cathedral Quartet on I Saw the Light
 1968: J. D. Sumner and the Stamps Quartet on Music, Music, Music
 1968: The Statesmen Quartet on Standing on the Promises
 1971: Connie Smith on Come Along and Walk with Me
 1977: Tennessee Ernie Ford on He Touched Me
 1997: The Jordanaires on Sing Elvis' Favorite Gospel Songs
 1999: Lawrence Welk, featuring Tom Netherton on Songs of Faith (also Netherton performed the song on the Welk's weekly show)
 2013: Steven Curtis Chapman on Deep Roots
 2014: Planetshakers on "This Is Our Time"

References

1963 songs
Elvis Presley songs
Gospel songs